Les Yeux jaunes des crocodiles is a 2014 French drama film directed by Cécile Telerman and based on the best-selling novel Les Yeux jaunes des crocodiles by Katherine Pancol. The film stars  Julie Depardieu, Emmanuelle Béart, Alice Isaaz and Jacques Weber.

Cast 
 Julie Depardieu as Joséphine Cortes 
 Emmanuelle Béart as Iris Dupin 
 Patrick Bruel as Philippe Dupin 
 Alice Isaaz as Hortense Cortes 
 Jacques Weber as Marcel Grobz 
 Karole Rocher as Josiane Lambert 
 Édith Scob as Henriette Grobz 
 Samuel Le Bihan as Antoine Cortes 
 Quim Gutiérrez as Luca Giampaoli 
 Jana Bittnerova as Irina 
 Nancy Tate as Shirley 
 Alysson Paradis as Mylène 
 Nathalie Besançon as Bérangère 
 Bruno Debrandt as Bruno Chaval 
 Ariel Wizman as Gaston Serrurier

Accolades

References

External links 
 

2014 films
2014 drama films
2010s French-language films
French drama films
Films based on French novels
2010s French films